Lê Thanh Điền (born May 4, 1967), known online as Thanh Điền guitar / Thanh Dien guitarist, is a born blind Vietnamese guitarist. 

He is known through YouTube for backing music for singers singing old and modern songs.

Life 
He was born blind, and was adopted by a family. After his adoptive parents died, Thanh Dien now lives with his adoptive brother in Trung An commune, Cờ Đỏ district, Cần Thơ city.

He learned to play the guitar from 9-10 years old. He said it took him about 15 years to be able to be proficient in playing. He currently can play guitar, mandolin, đàn nhị, đàn nguyệt.

He made a living by playing the guitar at parties and weddings. According to him, when playing the accompaniment for others to sing, he found himself useful. In addition to backing, he can play solo, or backing nhạc tài tử.

Singers make trips to his home to record the songs they like. When these videos were posted on YouTube, he was admired by most for his guitar playing technique that combines melody, solo and drum at the same time. When he plays, the listener feels as if there is an entire band with a variety of instruments playing. However, he still said, “I can play fine only for 16-17 years, but it is still not good. Other people plays better than me multiple times”.

Quotes 
 "God took my eyes, and gave me much better ears to hear. I can hear much clearer than normal people. But at the beginning, it was also very arduous, my hands were hurt, and the guitar sound was not good. I was extremely frustrated, sometimes I wanted to give up. But then I had nothing, only the guitar as a companion. So finally I picked up the guitar again."

References

External links 
 YouTube channel contains guitar playing videos of Thanh Dien
 Reportage on Thanh Dien on YouTube of the Can Tho newspaper online

People from Cần Thơ
Vietnamese guitarists
Internet memes
Living people
1967 births
Blind musicians